Tesco Mobile Limited (trading as Tesco Mobile) is a mobile virtual network operator (MVNO) in the United Kingdom, Ireland, Slovakia, and the Czech Republic. It is operated by British retailer Tesco, using the network O2 as its carrier except in Ireland, where the network operator is Three Ireland.

Overview
Tesco Mobile was established in May 2003 and launched pre-paid mobile services in Tesco stores and online by the end of the year. In January 2014, the network in the United Kingdom started offering 4G service, for its pay monthly and SIM only customers at no extra cost, extending the service to pay as you go customers in July of that year.

, the company was a 50:50 joint venture between Tesco (through its subsidiaries Tesco Mobile Communications Limited and Tesco Mobile Services Limited) and Virgin Media O2 (through its subsidiary O2 Communications Limited).

Outside the United Kingdom

Ireland
In December 2006, Tesco Ireland announced that it would enter into a joint venture with O2 Ireland to offer mobile telecommunications services. The service, which was Ireland's second MVNO (the defunct Cellular 3 having been the first), used the O2 network but operates separately. It has been allocated the area code 089. As with Tesco's mobile service of the United Kingdom, it is branded Tesco Mobile. The network commenced operation in 2007. Tesco Mobile had 375,000 customers in Ireland as of August 2017.

In March 2015, after it was announced that Three had purchased O2's Irish operations, it was announced that the O2 Ireland network would close and that the O2 website, shops and network would merge into Three Ireland. As a result, Tesco Mobile Ireland moved from the O2 network to the Three network. Since August 2018, Tesco Mobile customers can access Three masts, which means that they can now avail of 4G as well as increased 3G coverage.

Slovakia
In December 2009, Tesco Stores SR announced that it would enter into a joint venture with Telefónica Slovakia to offer mobile telecommunications services. The service, which is Slovakia's second MVNO (the naymobile having been the first), uses the O2 network but operates separately.

Czech Republic
In May 2013, Tesco Stores ČR a.s. announced that it would enter into a joint venture with Telefónica Czech Republic to offer mobile telecommunications services. The service uses the O2 network.

Discontinued operations 
Tesco Mobile Hungary was a 50:50 joint venture, providing Tesco Mobile branded services in Hungary through Tesco stores and online, using Vodafone's technology and network. Services were ended in April 2016, and the service was taken over by Vodafone.

References

External links
 

Tesco
Mobile virtual network operators
British companies established in 2003
Telecommunications companies established in 2003
Mobile phone companies of the United Kingdom
Telecommunications companies of the Republic of Ireland